The English Language Proficiency for Aeronautical Communication (ELPAC) is a EUROCONTROL test for aeronautical communication designed to assess ICAO English Language Proficiency for pilots and air traffic controllers, and reflects the range of tasks undertaken in air traffic control and pilot communications. The test focuses on language proficiency, not operational procedures.

ICAO Requirements for Language Proficiency

With the implementation of the ICAO language proficiency requirements in 2011, the international aeronautical community took a significant step towards improving safety in aviation. Now all air traffic controllers and pilots operating in internationally designated airspace and on international air routes have to demonstrate their proficiency in the language(s) they have for aeronautical communication.

In order to maintain the operational standard, air traffic controllers and pilots must achieve at least level 4 according to ICAO's language proficiency requirements. Their language proficiency is a licence endorsement without which air traffic control and pilot licences cannot be issued. 
ICAO Standards and Recommended Practices (SARPs) for Language Proficiency Requirements (LPR) - requires organisations worldwide to ensure that the language proficiency tests they work with are reliable, effective and appropriate for the aviation industry.

ELPAC is the first English Language Proficiency test to achieve full ICAO recognition since 2012.

Background
ELPAC was developed by EUROCONTROL, in partnership with the Zurich University of Applied Sciences/ZHAW and ENOVATE A.S. (Bergen, Norway). It is designed to help Air Navigation Service Providers (ANSP), Aircraft Operators (AO), National Supervisory Authorities (NSA) and training organisations (TO) meet the ICAO language proficiency requirements.
 
ELPAC test development began in November 2004 following extensive feasibility studies. In February 2005 a core development team, consisting of air traffic controllers and English language experts from six countries and EUROCONTROL, began designing the test specifications and items/tasks in accordance with the ICAO language proficiency requirements.

ELPAC test design and structure
ELPAC tests English language proficiency at ICAO level 4. (operational) and level 5 (extended) Both standard ICAO phraseology and plain language are included in the test. Plain language proficiency is an essential component of radiotelephony communications, as it is not possible to develop standard phraseologies to cover every conceivable situation.
 
There are currently two versions of ELPAC available, which were designed specifically to reflect the communicative functions of air traffic controllers and commercial pilots.

There are two papers, and candidates are required to successfully complete both:
Listening Comprehension (also referred to as ELPAC Paper 1)
Oral Interaction (also referred to as ELPAC Paper 2)
ELPAC Paper 1 is administered via the Internet and takes around 40 minutes to complete.

ELPAC Paper 2 is administered by two ELPAC examiners, a language expert and an operational expert, and takes around 20 minutes to complete.

ELPAC for air traffic controllers
ELPAC Paper 1 (Listening Comprehension) tests the understanding of communications between pilots and controllers and between controllers and controllers in both routine and non-routine situations. The recordings are based on authentic material and range from short standard pilot transmissions to longer communications in which the controller deals with non-routine or unusual situations.

ELPAC Paper 2 (Oral Interaction) assesses the controller's proficiency through non-visual and visual communication in three tasks. This includes:
The correct use of standard ICAO phraseology 
Switching between structured phrases, standard ICAO phraseology and plain English
Making an appropriate response to a pilot message
Resolving misunderstandings
Dealing effectively with the relationship between pilot and controller
Negotiating a developing unusual situation
Making a verbal report in English (on an unusual non-routine situation)
Producing extended speech in an aviation context.

ELPAC for pilots
ELPAC Paper 1 (Listening Comprehension) tests the understanding of communications between pilots and controllers in both routine and non-routine situations. The recordings are based on authentic material and range from short standard pilot transmissions to longer communications in which the pilot deals with non-routine or unusual situations.

ELPAC Paper 2 (oral Interaction) assesses the pilot's proficiency through a series of different tasks. This includes:
switching between structured phrases and plain English 
making an appropriate report on an unusual ATC-related event
resolving misunderstandings
effectively managing the relationship between pilot and controller
negotiating meaning
producing extended speech in an aviation context
  Online language proficiency test ( Level4, Level5, Level6 ) for pilots in english or german

ELPAC Level 6 Test for air traffic controllers and pilots

The ELPAC level 6 test is available after the first series of language proficiency tests has been completed for organisations wishing to test their staff at ICAO level 6, which is referred to as ELPAC Paper 3.

ELPAC Paper 3 (level 6 test) assesses the air traffic controller's or pilot's proficiency at ICAO level 6, verifying through four tasks that the candidate is able to:
understand and avoid idiomatic English
recognise and avoid ambiguity
use clear and concise English
negotiate meaning
clarify potential misunderstandings

These requirements are in accordance with the ICAO rating scale description of a level 6 speaker. The ELPAC level 6 test can be taken only after the candidate has demonstrated ICAO level 5 first in the regular ELPAC test.

Access
ELPAC is currently available to Air Navigation Service Providers, Aircraft Operators, CAAs and Training Organisations worldwide subject to a Licence Agreement with EUROCONTROL.

ELPAC Preparation
EUROCONTROL provides a set of online sample tests that can be used by ELPAC test candidates to familiarise themselves with the ELPAC test format and task types.
ELPAC Paper 1 sample test for air traffic controllers
ELPAC Paper 1 sample test for pilots

This will make candidates feel more confident; however, it is the level of English language proficiency that determines the result of the ELPAC test.

See also
 SKYbrary

References

External links 
 ELPAC site
 Official EUROCONTROL site
 Official ICAO site

Air traffic control